Przyborów  is a village in the administrative district of Gmina Nowa Sól, within Nowa Sól County, Lubusz Voivodeship, in western Poland.

The village has a population of 1,200.

References

Villages in Nowa Sól County